Pogar is an Urban-type settlement in Bryansk Oblast, Russia. It is the administrative center of Pogarsky District. Population: 

Located on Sudost River, a tributary of the Desna River, 7 km from the Pogar railway station and 128 km south-west of Bryansk, the administrative center of the region.

History
Pogar is one of the oldest settlements of the Russian Federation. According to archeological data, the first Slavic settlement in this place appeared in the 8th-9th centuries. In 1155 locality was first mentioned as an urban settlement Radosch later Radogosch. In the late 1230s it was ravaged by the Mongols. [2]

In the second half of the 14th century, the town passed into the possession of Lithuania. In the years 1500-1618 was an under the rule of the Russian state. In the autumn of 1534 the governor of Kiev Andrey Nemirovich Radogosch burned, but he was unable to take Starodub and Chernigov. After the destruction of Radogoscha by the Lithuanians in 1563, the population fled; On the site of the former population remained only long mound.

The exact reappearance of the town is unknown but by that time the town already bore the name of  Pogar. In 1618 it was captured by Poland, 1654, after joining the left-bank Ukraine to Russia as part of the Russian state. Before elimination of Catherine II regimental device autonomous Hetman of Ukraine in 1783 was part of the Starodub Regiment, which was the center of Pogarskij hundreds.

From the middle of the 17th century called "Pogar" and the Magdeburg Law. The town was famous for its fairs. Since 1781 - the county town of Novgorod-Seversky governorship, after the dissolution of which in 1796 left for the staff. Until 1929 was part of the Starodub district, where it was the parish center.

In 1910, the cigar factory merchant Shepfera was transferred to the town of Pochep. In the years 1913-1915, there was one more tobacco company - cigar factory AG Rutenberg.

In 1918, during the Austro-German occupation of Starodub, Pogar was given temporary county center status power.

On May 25, 1919, Pohar was transferred to the category of settlements of rural type, and on July 10, 1938 it was granted an urban-type settlement status.

It is the only population center of the municipality Pogarsky urban settlement.

External links

Urban-type settlements in Bryansk Oblast
Starodubsky Uyezd